The Korean Sevens is an international rugby union sevens tournament contested by men's national teams. The tournament forms part of the Asian Sevens Series, and is hosted, as of 2017, in Incheon at the Namdong Rugby Field.

Results

See also
 Asian Sevens Series

References

  
Asian Seven Series
International rugby union competitions hosted by South Korea
Rugby sevens competitions in Asia